Kurzia sinensis is a species of liverworts in the family Lepidoziaceae. It is endemic to China. Its natural habitat is temperate forests. It is threatened by habitat loss.

References

Lepidoziaceae
Flora of China
Critically endangered plants
Taxonomy articles created by Polbot